
Year 837 (DCCCXXXVII) was a common year starting on Monday (link will display the full calendar) of the Julian calendar.

Events 
 By place 
 Byzantine Empire 
 Byzantine–Arab War: Emperor Theophilos leads a massive Byzantine expeditionary force into Mesopotamia. He sacks the cities Arsamosata and Sozopetra—which some sources claim as the birthplace of Abbasid caliph Al-Mu'tasim—and forces Melitene to pay tribute.
 The Slavs in the vicinity of Thessaloniki revolt against the Byzantine Empire. Theophilos undertakes an evacuation of some Byzantine captives, who are settled in trans-Danubian Bulgaria.

 Europe 
 Presian I, ruler (khan) of the Bulgarian Empire, sends his prime-minister Isbul against the Smolyani (a Slavic tribe in Byzantine territory near the Struma River). The Bulgarian army campaigns along the Aegean coasts, and conquers most of Thrace and Macedonia, including the fortress city of Philippi (see Presian Inscription).
 The city of Naples (modern Italy) is attacked by Saracens from Egypt demanding an annual payment (approximate date).

 Britain 
 King Drest IX dies after a 3-year reign. He is succeeded by his cousin Eóganan, as ruler of the Picts.

 By topic 
 Astronomy 
 April 10 – Comet Halley passes approximately 5 million km from Earth, its closest ever approach.

Births 
 Al-Muntasir, Muslim caliph (d. 862)
 Baldwin I, margrave of Flanders (approximate date)
 Ibn Duraid, Muslim poet and philologist (d. 933)
 Ibn Khuzaymah, Muslim hadith and scholar (d. 923)

Deaths 
 Antony I, patriarch of Constantinople
 Drest IX, king of the Picts
 Eadwulf, bishop of Lindsey
 Giovanni I, doge of Venice 
 Hugh of Tours, Frankish nobleman
 Li Zaiyi, general of the Tang Dynasty (b. 788)
 Maxentius, patriarch of Aquileia
 Oliba I, Frankish nobleman
 Peter of Atroa, Byzantine abbot (b. 773)

References